The Creatures in the Garden of Lady Walton is an album by Clogs, released in March 2010. This is their first non-instrumental album, featuring several guest singers, including Shara Worden, singer and songwriter of the indie rock band My Brightest Diamond, Matt Berninger, lead singer of Clogs' sister band the National and Sufjan Stevens, a prominent indie folk singer/songwriter.

The name of the album is a reference to  La Mortella, a private garden on the Italian island of Ischia created by Lady Susana Walton, wife of composer William Walton.

Track listing 
All songs written by Padma Newsome.

 "Cocodrillo" – 1:50
 "I Used to Do" – 4:35
 "On the Edge" – 4:01
 "Red Seas" – 6:13
 "The Owl of Love" – 4:11
 "Adages of Cleansing" – 5:54
 "Last Song" – 3:59
 "To Hugo" – 4:27
 "Raise the Flag" – 2:47
 "We Were Here" – 4:22

Personnel 
 Padma Newsome: violin, viola, mandola, celeste, voice
 Bryce Dessner: guitars, mandola, ukulele
 Aaron Dessner: guitar, bass guitar
 Thomas Kozumplik: percussion
 Rachael Elliott: bassoon
 Shara Worden: voice
 Matt Berninger: voice
 Sufjan Stevens: voice, banjo
 Sue Newsome: clarinet
 Michael Atkinson: horn
 Kyle Resnick: trumpet
 Osso String Quartet: Ha-yang Kim: cello, Irena Havel: viola da gamba, Vojtech Havel: viola da gambas, Luca Tarantino: baroque guitar, theorbo.

References

External links 
 Brassland.org
 

2010 albums
Brassland Records albums